Bobo Sacko (born 7 May 1988) is a French Muay Thai fighter, who has been professionally competing since 2010. He is the current WMC Welterweight World champion.

He is the former  WPMF Super Welterweight World champion and WBC Muaythai European champion, as well as the former WBC Muaythai French, FMDA and FFSCDA Welterweight World champion.

Sacko holds notable wins over Rafi Bohic, Liam Harrison, Jimmy Vienot and Petchboonchu FA Group.

Muay Thai career
Sacko participated in the La Nuit des Titans four man welterweight tournament. He won a unanimous decisions against Jimmy Vienot in the semi finals, and Petchboonchu FA Group in the final match.

Sacko fought Fabio Pinca during Warriors Night 4, losing the fight by a unanimous decision. Afterwards, he fought Yodwicha Banchamek during Best of Siam event organized in Paris. Sacko lost the fight by a unanimous decision.

During the La Nuit des Titans 2016 event, Sacko fought Erkan Varol, winning the fight by a third round TKO.

In 2017 Sacko fought the former Rajadamnern Stadium and WMC champion Singmanee Kaewsamrit for the vacant WPMF World Welterweight title. Bobo won the fight by a unanimous decision.

He faced Changpuek Muaythai Academy during All Star Muaythai in February of 2018, winning the fight by decision.

Bobo Sacko fought the former two time Lumpini Stadium champion Rafi Bohic during the Duel 3 event. Sacko won the fight by a unanimous decision.

He made his ONE Championship debut during ONE Championship: Immortal Triumph, being scheduled to face Kulabdam Sor.Jor.Piek-U-Thai. Sacko lost the fight by a unanimous decision.

Sacko fought for the WMC World Welterweight title against Chadd Collins. He won the fight by a unanimous decision.

Championships and accomplishments
Fédération française de kick boxing, muay thaï et disciplines associées
 2011 FFSCDA Welterweight Championship

Fédération de Muaythaï et Disciplines Associées
 2011 FMDA Welterweight Championship

La Nuit des Titans
 2015 La Nuit des Titans 4-Man Welterweight Tournament Winner

World Boxing Council Muaythai
 2012 WBC Muaythai French Welterweight Championship
 2014 WBC Muaythai European Welterweight Championship
 2022 WBC Muaythai International Welterweight Championship

World Professional Muaythai Federation
 2017 interim WPMF World Super Welterweight Championship
 2013 WPMF European Welterweight Championship

World Muaythai Council
 2019 WMC World Welterweight Championship

Professional Muay Thai record

|-  bgcolor=""
| 2023-03-07||||align=left| Nauzet Trujillo || || Kuwait ||  |||| 
|-
! style=background:white colspan=9 |

|-  bgcolor="#cfc"
| 2022-12-12||Win ||align=left| Garrett Smylie || DEWT || Midoun, Tunisia || Decision (Unanimous) || 5 || 3:00
|-
! style=background:white colspan=9 |

|-  bgcolor="#cfc"
| 2019-12-14||Win ||align=left| Chadd Collins || Golden Fight || Paris, France || Decision (Unanimous) || 5 || 3:00
|-
! style=background:white colspan=9 |
|-  bgcolor="#fbb"
| 2019-02-20 || Loss ||align=left| Kulabdam Sor.Jor.Piek-U-Thai || ONE Championship: Immortal Triumph || Ho Chi Minh City, Vietnam || Decision (Unanimous) || 3 || 3:00
|-  bgcolor="#cfc"
| 2019-02-20||Win ||align=left| Fasai Chang Gym || All Star Muay Thai || Paris, France || KO || 2 ||
|-  bgcolor="#cfc"
| 2018-10-12||Win ||align=left| Kriengkrai Sor Pongamorn || All Star Muay Thai || Aubervilliers, France || Decision (Unanimous) || 3 || 3:00
|-  bgcolor="#cfc"
| 2018-04-08||Win ||align=left| Rafi Bohic || Duel 3 || Paris, France || Decision (Unanimous) || 3 || 3:00
|-  bgcolor="#fbb"
| 2018-02-27|| Loss ||align=left| Buakiew Sitsongpeenong || Best Of Siam XII, Lumpinee Stadium || Bangkok, Thailand || TKO (Body kick) || 4||
|-
! style=background:white colspan=9 |
|-  bgcolor="#cfc"
| 2018-02-01||Win ||align=left| Changpuek Muaythai Academy || All Star Muay-Thai || Paris, France || Decision (Unanimous) || 3 || 3:00
|-  bgcolor="#cfc"
| 2017-09-12||Win ||align=left| Liam Harrison || Golden Fight || Levallois-Perret, France || Decision (Unanimous) || 3 || 3:00
|-  bgcolor="#cfc"
| 2017-05-13||Win ||align=left| Singmanee Kaewsamrit || La Nuit Des Titans 4 || Montereau-Fault-Yonne, France || Decision (Unanimous) || 5 || 3:00
|-
! style=background:white colspan=9 |
|-  bgcolor="#cfc"
| 2017-03-4|| Win ||align=left| Kongfah Sitmonchai || Le Choc Des Légendes || Saint-Ouen-sur-Seine, France || TKO || 4 ||
|-  bgcolor="#cfc"
| 2016-03-12|| Win ||align=left| Erkan Varol || La Nuit des Titans || Tours, France || TKO || 3 ||
|-  bgcolor="#fbb"
| 2015-12-11|| Loss ||align=left| Yodwicha Banchamek || Best Of Siam 7 || Paris, France || Decision (Unanimous) || 3 || 3:00
|-  bgcolor="#fbb"
| 2015-11-21|| Loss ||align=left| Fabio Pinca || Warriors Night 4 || Paris, France || Decision (Unanimous) || 3 || 3:00
|-  bgcolor="#cfc"
| 2015-06-18|| Win ||align=left| Manasak Sitniwat || Best Of Siam 6 || Tours, France || Decision (Unanimous) || 3 || 3:00
|-  bgcolor="#c5d2ea"
| 2015-05-16|| Draw ||align=left| Marc Dass Rey || Heroes Fight Night || Berlin, Germany || Decision (Unanimous) || 3 || 3:00
|-  bgcolor="#cfc"
| 2015-02-07 || Win ||align=left| Petchboonchu FA Group || La Nuit des Titans || Tours, France || Decision (Unanimous) || 3 || 3:00 
|-
! style=background:white colspan=9 |
|-  bgcolor="#cfc"
| 2015-02-07 || Win ||align=left| Jimmy Vienot || La Nuit des Titans || Tours, France || Decision (Unanimous) || 3 || 3:00
|-  bgcolor="#cfc"
| 2014-05-24 || Win ||align=left| Mauro Serra || Thai Boxing Showtime 5 || Hazebrouck, France || Decision (Unanimous) || 5 || 3:00
|-
! style=background:white colspan=9 |
|-  bgcolor="#cfc"
| 2014-04-04 || Win ||align=left| Charles François || Warriors Night || Paris, France || Decision (Unanimous) || 3 || 3:00
|-  bgcolor="#cfc"
| 2014-01-25 || Win ||align=left| Morgan Adrar || La Ligue des Gladiateurs || Paris, France || Decision (Unanimous) || 3 || 3:00
|-  bgcolor="#cfc"
| 2013-11-15 || Win ||align=left| Lampard Sor Kamsing || Muaythai League || Paris, France || Decision (Unanimous) || 3 || 3:00
|-  bgcolor="#fbb"
| 2013-10-11|| Loss ||align=left| Sergey Kulyaba || Warriors Night || Issy-les-Moulineaux, France || KO || 2 ||
|-  bgcolor="#fbb"
| 2013-06-20 || Loss ||align=left| Petchasawin Seatransferry || Best Of Siam 4 || Paris, France || Decision (Unanimous) || 3 || 3:00
|-  bgcolor="#cfc"
| 2013-05-25|| Win ||align=left| Jesus Cosa Aznar || Thai Boxing Showtime 4 || Hazebrouck, France || KO (High kick)|| 1 || 
|-
! style=background:white colspan=9 |
|-  bgcolor="#cfc"
| 2013-04-27|| Win ||align=left| Jason Woodham || No Pain, No Muay Thai || Andenne, Belgium || KO || 1 ||
|-  bgcolor="#cfc"
| 2013-03-02|| Win ||align=left| Dek Bunjong || Warriors Night || Levallois-Perret, France || Decision (Unanimous) || 3 || 3:00
|-  bgcolor="#fbb"
| 2012-11-22 || Loss ||align=left| Petchasawin Seatransferry || Best Of Siam 2 || Paris, France || TKO (Corner stoppage) || 4 ||
|-  bgcolor="#fbb"
| 2012-06-10 || Loss ||align=left| Azize Hlali || TIME FIGHT: Event 2 || Joué-lès-Tours, France || Decision (Unanimous) || 3 || 3:00
|-  bgcolor="#cfc"
| 2012-06-14|| Win ||align=left| Amadou Ba || Best Of Siam || Paris, France || KO || 3 ||
|-
! style=background:white colspan=9 |
|-  bgcolor="#cfc"
| 2012-03-24 || Win ||align=left| Edgar Zuniga || Le Choc des Mondes VII || Bruay-sur-l'Escaut, France || Decision (Unanimous) || 3 || 3:00
|-  bgcolor="#cfc"
| 2012-03-10 || Win ||align=left| Seif Hajri || Le choc de Légendes || Saint-Ouen-sur-Seine, France || TKO || 2 ||
|-  bgcolor="#cfc"
| 2011-12-04 || Win ||align=left| Somchai Lieud Paidliu || King's Birthday || Bangkok, Thailand || KO || 4 ||
|-  bgcolor="#cfc"
| 2011-10-29 || Win ||align=left| Lahoucine Idouchei || Gala de Muay Thaï || Saint-Étienne-du-Rouvray, France || Decision (Unanimous) || 3 || 3:00
|-  bgcolor="#cfc"
| 2011-05-28 || Win ||align=left| Fabrice Delannond || Finales Championnat National de Boxe Thai || Mondeville, Calvados, France || Decision (Unanimous) || 3 || 3:00
|-
! style=background:white colspan=9 |
|-  bgcolor="#cfc"
| 2011-05-07 || Win ||align=left| Aurélien Baup || Finales Championnat De France Muaythai || Paris, France || Decision (Unanimous) || 3 || 3:00
|-
! style=background:white colspan=9 |
|-  bgcolor="#cfc"
| 2011-03-26 || Win ||align=left| Murvin Babajee || 1/2 Finales Championnat de France De Muaythai FFSCDA || Paris, France || Decision (Unanimous) || 3 || 3:00
|-  bgcolor="#cfc"
| 2011-01-15 || Win ||align=left| Olivier Guidicelli || Muay Thai à Vannes || Vannes, France || TKO || 4 ||
|-  bgcolor="#cfc"
| 2010-12-04 || Win ||align=left| Kichima Yattabare || Championnat Ile De France || Paris, France || KO || 2 ||
|-  bgcolor="#cfc"
| 2010-10-29 || Win ||align=left| Olivier Tchetche || France Vs Thaïlande : Mabel Vs Saiyoke || Paris, France || Decision (Unanimous) || 3 || 3:00
|-  bgcolor="#cfc"
| 2010-06-12 || Win ||align=left| Allan Gozdzicki || Operation Muay Thai 3 || Strasbourg, France || KO || 2 || 
|-
| colspan=9 | Legend:

See also
 List of male kickboxers

References

1988 births
Living people
French Muay Thai practitioners
Welterweight kickboxers
Sportspeople from Seine-et-Marne
Black French sportspeople
ONE Championship kickboxers